David Berman may refer to:
David Berman (mobster) (1903–1957), Jewish-American mobster
David Berman (musician) (1967–2019), American singer-songwriter, poet, cartoonist, and member of Silver Jews
David Berman (graphic designer) (born 1962), Canadian author, graphic designer and sustainability chair/vice-president at Icograda
David Berman (actor) (born 1973), American actor and researcher on CSI: Crime Scene Investigation